The year 1947 in film involved some significant events.

Top-grossing films (U.S.)
The top ten 1947 released films by box office gross in North America are as follows:

Events
April 19 – Monogram Pictures release their first film under their Allied Artists banner, It Happened on Fifth Avenue.
May 22 – Great Expectations is premiered in New York.
August 31 – The first Edinburgh International Film Festival opens at the Playhouse Cinema, presented by the Edinburgh Film Guild as part of the Edinburgh Festival of the Arts. Originally specialising in documentaries, it will become the world's oldest continually running film festival.
November 24 – The United States House of Representatives of the 80th Congress voted 346 to 17 to approve citations for contempt of Congress against the "Hollywood Ten".
November 25 – The Waldorf Statement is released by the executives of the United States motion picture industry that marks the beginning of the Hollywood blacklist.

Awards

Top Ten Money Making Stars

Notable films released in 1947
United States unless stated

#
13 Rue Madeleine, starring James Cagney

A
Admiral Nakhimov – (USSR)
Along the Songhua River (Songhua-jiang shang) – (China)
Angel and the Badman, starring John Wayne and Gail Russell

B
The Bachelor and the Bobby-Soxer, starring Cary Grant, Shirley Temple, Myrna Loy
Between Yesterday and Tomorrow, starring Hildegard Knef – (Germany)
The Big Fix, starring Sheila Ryan
The Bishop's Wife, starring Cary Grant, Loretta Young, David Niven
Black Narcissus, written and directed by Michael Powell and Emeric Pressburger, starring Deborah Kerr, Sabu, Jean Simmons – (GB)
Body and Soul, directed by Robert Rossen, starring John Garfield and Lilli Palmer
Boomerang, starring Dana Andrews
Born to Kill, starring Claire Trevor and Lawrence Tierney
The Brasher Doubloon, starring George Montgomery
Brighton Rock, a Boulting Brothers film, starring Richard Attenborough – (GB)
Brute Force, directed by Jules Dassin, starring Burt Lancaster
Buck Privates Come Home, starring Bud Abbott and Lou Costello
Bury Me Dead, starring June Lockhart and Hugh Beaumont

C
Captain Boycott, directed by Frank Launder, starring Stewart Granger – (GB)
Captain from Castile, starring Tyrone Power
Carnegie Hall, starring Marsha Hunt
Cass Timberlane, starring Spencer Tracy and Lana Turner
Cinderella (Zolushka) – (U.S.S.R.)
Copacabana, starring Groucho Marx and Carmen Miranda
Crossfire, starring Robert Young, Robert Mitchum, Robert Ryan, Gloria Grahame
Cynthia (film), starring Elizabeth Taylor and George Murphy

D
Daisy Kenyon, directed by Otto Preminger, starring Joan Crawford, Henry Fonda, Dana Andrews
Dancing with Crime, starring Richard Attenborough and Sheila Sim – (GB)
Dark Passage, starring Humphrey Bogart and Lauren Bacall'
Dead Reckoning, starring Humphrey Bogart and Lizabeth Scott
Deep Valley, directed by Jean Negulesco, starring Ida Lupino
Desert Fury, starring John Hodiak, Burt Lancaster, Lizabeth Scott
Desperate, directed by Anthony Mann, starring Steve Brodie and Raymond Burr
Devil in the Flesh (Diable au corps) – (France)
The Devil Thumbs a Ride, starring Lawrence Tierney
Dick Tracy Meets Gruesome, starring Boris Karloff and Ralph Byrd
Driftwood, starring Walter Brennan and Natalie Wood
A Double Life, starring Ronald Colman and Shelley Winters
Down to Earth, starring Rita Hayworth and Larry Parks
Dreams That Money Can Buy, directed by Hans Richter

E
The Egg and I, starring Claudette Colbert and Fred MacMurray
Eight Thousand Li of Cloud and Moon (Ba qian li lu yun he yue) – (China)
Escape Me Never, starring Ida Lupino, Eleanor Parker, Errol Flynn
The Exile, directed by Max Ophuls, starring Douglas Fairbanks, Jr. and Maria Montez

F
Fame is the Spur, a Boulting Brothers film, with Michael Redgrave – (GB)
Far Away Love, directed by Chen Liting, starring Zhao Dan and Qin Yi – (China)
The Farmer's Daughter, starring Loretta Young
Fear in the Night, starring DeForest Kelley
Fireworks, directed by Kenneth Anger
The Flame, starring Vera Ralston and Broderick Crawford
Flesh Will Surrender (Il delitto di Giovanni Episcopo), starring Aldo Fabrizi – (Italy)
Forever Amber, starring Linda Darnell
The Foxes of Harrow, starring Rex Harrison and Maureen O'Hara – (GB/U.S.)
Framed, starring Glenn Ford
Frieda, directed by Basil Dearden, starring David Farrar, Glynis Johns, Mai Zetterling – (GB)
The Fugitive, starring Henry Fonda and Dolores del Río
Fun and Fancy Free, an animated film from Disney and RKO

G
The Garcias Return! (¡Vuelven los Garcia!), starring Pedro Infante – (Mexico)
Gentleman's Agreement, starring Gregory Peck, Dorothy McGuire, Celeste Holm, John Garfield
The Ghost and Mrs. Muir, starring Gene Tierney and Rex Harrison
Golden Earrings, starring Ray Milland and Marlene Dietrich
Good News, starring June Allyson and Peter Lawford
Green Dolphin Street, starring Lana Turner and Donna Reed
The Guilt of Janet Ames, starring Rosalind Russell
The Guilty, starring Bonita Granville

H
Heaven Only Knows, starring Robert Cummings
Hi-De-Ho, starring Cab Calloway
High Barbaree, starring Van Johnson and June Allyson 
High Wall, starring Robert Taylor
Honeymoon, starring Shirley Temple
The Hucksters, starring Clark Gable and Deborah Kerr
Hue and Cry, the first Ealing comedy, directed by Charles Crichton – (GB)
The Humpbacked Horse (Konyok Gorbunok) – (U.S.S.R.)
Hungry Hill, starring Margaret Lockwood and Dennis Price – (GB)

I
An Ideal Husband, directed by Alexander Korda, starring Michael Wilding and Paulette Goddard – (GB)
If Winter Comes, starring Deborah Kerr, Walter Pidgeon, Angela Lansbury
The Imperfect Lady, starring Ray Milland and Teresa Wright
In Those Days (In jenen Tagen) – (Germany)
It Always Rains on Sunday, starring Googie Withers and Jack Warner – (GB)
It Happened in Brooklyn, starring Frank Sinatra, Kathryn Grayson, Peter Lawford, and Jimmy Durante
It Happened on Fifth Avenue, starring Victor Moore, Don DeFore, Gale Storm, Charlie Ruggles

J
Jenny and the Soldier (Soldaten og Jenny) – (Denmark)
Johnny O'Clock, starring Dick Powell

K
Killer Dill, starring Stuart Erwin and Anne Gwynne
Kiss of Death, starring Victor Mature and Richard Widmark

L
The Lady from Shanghai, directed by and starring Orson Welles, with Rita Hayworth
Lady in the Lake, directed by and starring Robert Montgomery
Last of the Redskins, starring Michael O'Shea
The Last Stage (Ostatni etap) – (Poland)
The Late George Apley, starring Ronald Colman
Law of the Lash, starring Lash LaRue
Life with Father, starring William Powell and Elizabeth Taylor
A Likely Story, starring Barbara Hale and Bill Williams
Living in a Big Way, starring Gene Kelly and Marie McDonald
The Long Night, starring Henry Fonda and Barbara Bel Geddes
Lost Honeymoon, starring Franchot Tone and Ann Richards
The Lost Moment, starring Robert Cummings and Susan Hayward
Lost Youth (Gioventù perduta), directed by Pietro Germi – (Italy)
Love from a Stranger, starring John Hodiak 
Lured, starring George Sanders and Lucille Ball

M
The Macomber Affair, starring Gregory Peck and Joan Bennett
The Man I Love, starring Ida Lupino and Robert Alda
The Mark of Cain, directed by Brian Desmond Hurst (GB)
Marriage in the Shadows (Ehe im Schatten) – (East Germany)
Mine Own Executioner, starring Burgess Meredith – (GB)
Miracle on 34th Street, starring Edmund Gwenn, John Payne, Maureen O'Hara
Monsieur Verdoux, directed by and starring Charles Chaplin
Monsieur Vincent, starring Pierre Fresnay – (France)
Moss Rose, starring Peggy Cummins and Victor Mature
Mother Wore Tights, starring Betty Grable
Mourning Becomes Electra, starring Rosalind Russell and Michael Redgrave
My Favourite Brunette, starring Bob Hope and Dorothy Lamour
My Wild Irish Rose, a biopic starring Dennis Morgan (as Chauncey Olcott)

N
Neel Kamal (Blue Lotus), first film of Madhubala and Raj Kapoor in adult roles – (India)
Nicholas Nickleby, directed by Alberto Cavalcanti, starring Stanley Holloway – (GB)
Nightmare Alley, starring Tyrone Power and Joan Blondell
Nora Prentiss, starring Ann Sheridan
The October Man, starring John Mills and Joan Greenwood – (GB)

O
Odd Man Out, directed by Carol Reed, starring James Mason and Robert Newton – (GB)
One Wonderful Sunday (Subarashiki Nichiyōbi), directed by Akira Kurosawa – (Japan)
L'onorevole Angelina (Parliamentarian Angelina), directed by Luigi Zampa, starring Anna Magnani – (Italy)
Out of the Blue, starring Virginia Mayo and George Brent
Out of the Past, directed by Jacques Tourneur, starring Robert Mitchum, Jane Greer and Kirk Douglas

P
The Paradine Case, directed by Alfred Hitchcock, starring Gregory Peck, Alida Valli, Ann Todd, Louis Jourdan, Charles Laughton
The Pearl (La Perla), starring Pedro Armendáriz – (Mexico)
The Perils of Pauline, starring Betty Hutton
Pirates of Monterey, starring Rod Cameron and Maria Montez
Possessed, starring Joan Crawford and Van Heflin
Pursued, starring Robert Mitchum and Teresa Wright

Q
Quai des Orfèvres, directed by Henri-Georges Clouzot, starring Louis Jouvet – (France)

R
Railroaded!, directed by Anthony Mann, starring John Ireland and Hugh Beaumont
Ramrod, starring Joel McCrea and Veronica Lake
The Record of a Tenement Gentleman (Nagaya shinshiroku), directed by Yasujirō Ozu – (Japan)
The Red House, starring Edward G. Robinson and Judith Anderson
Repeat Performance, starring Louis Hayward and Joan Leslie
Ride the Pink Horse, directed by and starring Robert Montgomery
Riffraff, starring Pat O'Brien and Anne Jeffreys
Road to Rio, starring Bing Crosby, Dorothy Lamour, Bob Hope
The Romance of Rosy Ridge, starring Van Johnson, Thomas Mitchell, Janet Leigh
The Root of All Evil, starring Phyllis Calvert and Michael Rennie – (GB)
Roses Are Red, starring Peggy Knudsen

S
Scared to Death, starring Bela Lugosi and George Zucco
School for Postmen (L'École des facteurs), a comedy short directed by and starring Jacques Tati – (France)
The Sea of Grass, directed by Elia Kazan, starring Katharine Hepburn and Spencer Tracy
Secret Agent (Podvig razvedchika), directed by Boris Barnet – (U.S.S.R.)
The Secret Life of Walter Mitty, starring Danny Kaye and Virginia Mayo
The Senator Was Indiscreet, starring William Powell 
A Ship to India (Skepp till India land), directed by Ingmar Bergman – (Sweden)
The Shocking Miss Pilgrim, starring Betty Grable
Sinbad the Sailor
Smash-Up, the Story of a Woman, starring Susan Hayward
Snow Trail (Ginrei no hate), starring Toshiro Mifune – (Japan)
So Well Remembered, directed by Edward Dmytryk, starring John Mills and Martha Scott – (GB)
Something in the Wind, starring Deanna Durbin and Donald O'Connor
Song of Scheherazade, starring Yvonne De Carlo, Jean-Pierre Aumont, Brian Donlevy
Song of the Thin Man, starring William Powell and Myrna Loy
The Spring River Flows East (Yi jiang chun shui xiang dong liu) – (China)
Story of a Bad Woman (Historia de una mala mujer) – (Argentina)

T
T-Men, directed by Anthony Mann, starring Dennis O'Keefe
Temptation Harbour, starring Robert Newton and Simone Simon – (GB)
They Made Me a Fugitive, directed by Alberto Cavalcanti, starring Trevor Howard – (GB)
They Won't Believe Me, starring Robert Young and Susan Hayward
This Time for Keeps, starring Esther Williams and Jimmy Durante
The Three Garcias (Los tres García), starring Pedro Infante – (Mexico)
To Live in Peace (Vivere in pace) – (Italy)
The Two Mrs. Carrolls, starring Humphrey Bogart, Barbara Stanwyck, Alexis Smith
Trail Street, starring Randolph Scott

U
Uncle Silas, starring Jean Simmons – (GB)
Unconquered, starring Gary Cooper and Paulette Goddard
The Unfaithful, starring Ann Sheridan and Lew Ayres
The Unsuspected, starring Claude Rains and Joan Caulfield

V
The Voice of the Turtle, starring Ronald Reagan

W
The Web, starring Ella Raines and Edmond O'Brien
Welcome Stranger, starring Bing Crosby and Barry Fitzgerald
Whispering City, starring Paul Lukas – (Canada)
The Wistful Widow of Wagon Gap, starring Bud Abbott and Lou Costello
The Woman on the Beach, starring Joan Bennett and Robert Ryan
Wyoming, starring Wild Bill Elliott

Serials
The Black Widow, starring Bruce Edwards
Brick Bradford, starring Kane Richmond
Jack Armstrong
Jesse James Rides Again, starring Clayton Moore and Linda Stirling
The Sea Hound, starring Buster Crabbe
Son of Zorro, starring George Turner and Peggy Stewart
The Vigilante, starring Ralph Byrd

Short film series
Mickey Mouse (1928–1952)
Looney Tunes (1930–1969)
Terrytoons (1930–1964)
Merrie Melodies (1931–1969)
The Three Stooges (1934–1959)
Donald Duck (1934–1956)
Andy Panda (1939–1949)
Color Rhapsodies (1934–1949)
The Fox and the Crow (1941–1950)
Bugs Bunny (1940–1962)
Chip and Dale (1943–1956)
Red Hot Riding Hood (1943–1949)
Popeye (1933–1957)
Tom and Jerry (1940–1958)
George and Junior (1946–1948)
Mighty Mouse (1942–1955)
Pluto (1937–1951)
Goofy (1939–1953)
Woody Woodpecker (1941–1949)
Yosemite Sam (1945–1963)

Births
January 4 - Tim Rooney, American actor (d. 2006)
January 8 – David Bowie, English singer, songwriter and actor (d. 2016)
January 11
William Caskey Swaim, American actor
Vinny Vella, American actor, talk show host and comedian (d. 2019)
January 15 – Andrea Martin, Canadian-American actress
January 17 - Jane Elliot, American actress
January 18 – Takeshi Kitano, Japanese writer-director, actor, comedian, author and video game creator
January 23 - Joel Douglas, American producer
January 27 - Peter Burroughs, British actor
January 29 - Ernie Lively, American actor and acting coach (d. 2021)
January 31 – Jonathan Banks, American actor
February 2 – Farrah Fawcett, American actress (d. 2009)
February 5 – David Ladd, American producer, actor
February 7 – Wayne Allwine, American voice actor (d. 2009)
February 11 - Brian Capron, English actor
February 24 – Edward James Olmos, American actor
February 28 – Stephanie Beacham, English actress
March 4 - Gunnar Hansen, Icelandic actor (d. 2015)
March 6 – Rob Reiner, American actor, comedian, producer and director
March 10 - Colin Stinton, Canadian actor
March 18
Patrick Barlow, English actor, comedian and playwright
Aleksander Krupa, Polish actor
March 19
Glenn Close, American actress
Dermot Crowley, Irish stage, film and television actor
March 20 - Anthony Peck, American actor (d. 1996)
March 23 – Kim Hee-ra, South Korean movie actor
March 25 – Elton John, English actor and singer
March 26 – John Morton, American movie actor, stuntman and writer
April 2 - Sam Anderson, American actor
April 6 – John Ratzenberger, American actor
April 11
Peter Riegert, American actor, director and screenwriter
Meshach Taylor, American actor (d. 2014)
April 15 – Lois Chiles, American actress
April 18
Cindy Pickett, American actress
James Woods, American actor
April 25 - Jeffrey DeMunn, American actor
April 26 - Ron McLarty, American actor and playwright (d. 2020)
April 30 - Elizabeth Hawthorne, New Zealand actress
May 4 – Richard Jenkins, American actor
May 8
Jamie Donnelly, American actress
Katia Tchenko, French actress
May 9 - Anthony Higgins (actor), English actor
May 13 - Charles Gordon (producer), American producer (d. 2020)
May 14 - Hans Strydom (actor), South African actor and writer
May 16 - Bill Smitrovich, American actor
May 18 - Hugh Keays-Byrne, British-Australian actor and director (d. 2020)
May 25 – Jacki Weaver, Australian actress
June 1 – Jonathan Pryce, Welsh actor
June 6 – Robert Englund, American actor
June 10 - Fred Asparagus, American comedian and actor (d. 1998)
June 19 – Youn Yuh-jung, South-Korean actress
June 20 – Candy Clark, American actress
June 22 - David Lander, American character actor, comedian, musician and baseball scout (d. 2020)
June 23 - Bryan Brown, Australian actor
June 24 – Peter Weller, American actor
June 25 - Jimmie Walker, American actor and comedian
June 30 - Tõnis Rätsep, Estonian actor
July 6 - Richard Beckinsale, English actor (d. 1979)
July 9 – O. J. Simpson, American football player and actor
July 22 – Albert Brooks, American actor, comedian and director
July 29 - Dennis Cleveland Stewart, American actor and dancer (d. 1994)
July 30 
Arnold Schwarzenegger, Austrian-born American actor, bodybuilder and 38th Governor of California
William Atherton, American actor
July 31 – Richard Griffiths, English actor (d. 2013)
August 3 - John Wesley (actor), American actor (d. 2019)
August 15 - Jenny Hanley, English actress
August 19 - Gerald McRaney, American actor
August 20 - Ray Wise, American actor
August 22 – Cindy Williams, American actress
August 24 – Anne Archer, American actress
August 27 – Barbara Bach, American actress
August 31 - Mona Marshall, American voice actress
September 6 
 Jane Curtin – American actress and comedian
 Keone Young, American actor and voice actor
September 14 – Sam Neill, New Zealand actor
September 15 - Sandra Prinsloo, South African actress
September 21 – Stephen King, American author
September 27 – Denis Lawson, Scottish actor and director
September 29 - Martin Ferrero, American actor
October 1
Stephen Collins, American actor
Richard E. Council, American actor
October 13 - Susan Blommaert, American actress
October 17
 Simi Garewal, Indian actress and talk show host
 Michael McKean, American actor and comedian
October 18 - Joe Morton, American actor
October 23 - Frank DiLeo, American acto (d. 2011)
October 24 – Kevin Kline, American actor
October 26 – Ene Järvis, Estonian actress 
October 29 – Richard Dreyfuss, American actor
November 13 – Joe Mantegna, American actor
November 24 – Dwight Schultz, American actor and voice actor
November 25
John Larroquette, American actor
Tracey Walter, American character actor
November 30 
Stuart Baird, English editor, producer and director
David Mamet, American filmmaker and screenwriter
December 4 – Tõnu Kark, Estonian actor
December 8 – Bruce Kimmel, American actor, director, writer
December 10 - Kathy Lamkin, American actress (d. 2022)
December 11 – Teri Garr, American actress and comedian
December 16 – Ben Cross, English actor (d. 2020)
December 17 - Wes Studi, Cherokee American actor and film producer
December 25 - Twink Caplan, American actress, comedian and producer
December 26 - Trina Parks, American actress
December 28 - Peter MacGregor-Scott, British producer (d. 2017)
December 29 – Ted Danson, American actor
December 31 – Tim Matheson, American actor, director and producer

Deaths
January 26 – Grace Moore, 48, American opera singer and actress, One Night of Love, The King Steps Out, When You're in Love
February 12 – Sidney Toler, 72, American actor, Charlie Chan in the Secret Service, The Chinese Cat, Black Magic, The Jade Mask
March 8 – Victor Potel, 57, American actor and comedian, Sullivan's Travels, The Miracle of Morgan's Creek, The Palm Beach Story, The Egg and I
May 18 - Lucile Gleason, 59, American actress, I Like It That Way, A Successful Failure, Should Husbands Work?, The Clock
May 31 – Adrienne Ames, 39, American actress, The Death Kiss, You're Telling Me!, Slander House, Gigolette
June 1 – Anna Hofman-Uddgren, 79, Swedish director and actress
June 5 – Nils Olaf Chrisander, 63, Swedish actor and director
July 15 – Henry Kolker, 72, American actor and director, Baby Face, Holiday, The Great Swindle, The Parson of Panamint
July 28 – Robert Homans, 69, American actor, Suicide Squad, The Grapes of Wrath, Night Monster, The Scarlet Clue
August 30 – Gunnar Sommerfeldt, 56, Danish actor and director
September 21 – Harry Carey, 69, American actor, Mr. Smith Goes to Washington, Angel and the Badman, Red River, Beyond Tomorrow
 October 1 – Olive Borden, 41, American actress, 3 Bad Men, Half Marriage, Leave It to Me
 October 13 – LeRoy Mason, 44, American actor, The Painted Stallion, Silver Stallion
 October 17 – John Halliday, 67, American actor, The Philadelphia Story, Intermezzo
 October 18 – Harry C. Bradley, 78, American actor, Beyond the Law, Sing While You're Able
 October 24 – Dudley Digges, 68, Irish actor, The Maltese Falcon, Mutiny on the Bounty, The Fight for Life
 December 21 – Mark Hellinger, 47, American producer, High Sierra, They Drive By Night, The Two Mrs. Carrolls
 December 26 – Urban Gad, 68, Danish director and screenwriter, The Abyss, Little Angel, The Island of the Lost

Film debuts 
Anouk Aimée – La maison sous la mer
George Chakiris – Song of Love
Arlene Dahl – My Wild Irish Rose
Mel Ferrer – The Fugitive
DeForest Kelley – Fear in the Night
Janet Leigh – The Romance of Rosy Ridge
Toshiro Mifune – Snow Trail
Marilyn Monroe – The Shocking Miss Pilgrim
Sidney Poitier – Sepia Cinderella
Denver Pyle – The Guilt of Janet Ames
Richard Widmark – Kiss of Death

References 

 
Film by year